Bilal Lashari  is a Pakistani filmmaker, cinematographer, screenwriter and occasional actor. He made his directorial debut with Waar (2013), which at the time of release became Pakistan's highest-grossing film (currently 11th highest). His next project titled The Legend of Maula Jatt (2022) was a remake of the 1979 film Maula Jatt. The film broke box office records and became Pakistan's highest grossing film. Lashari won awards in four categories at the ARY Film Awards 2014 for his directorial debut.

Early life 
Bilal Lashari was born into a Punjabi Baloch family. His father, Kamran Lashari, is a retired senior Pakistani bureaucrat who served as a Federal Secretary and did a lot in cultural preservation in Lahore, while his paternal grandfather was a landlord, lawyer and poet. His younger brother, Rohail Lashari, an MBA graduate from HEC Paris, was the lead vocalist and rhythm guitarist for the Lahore-based band Jhol (2010-2015) and was "in charge" of the seventh season of Coke Studio Pakistan, while his other younger brother, Omar Lashari, is a Cornell-educated financial analyst. 

Lashari grew up in Pakistan, attending local schools. He went to the United States of America for college, studying at the Academy of Art University in San Francisco, California, where he earned a Bachelor of Fine Arts (BFA) in Motion Pictures and Television in 2008.

Career 
After his return to Pakistan, Lashari first directed music videos and won 'Best Music Video Director' twice at the Lux Style Awards and ‘Best Pop Video’ at the MTV Pakistan Music Video Awards for “Sajni”.  He has also directed “Chal Bulleya” for Meekal Hassan Band. He has worked with artists and bands such as Abrarul Haq, Atif Aslam, Mekaal Hassan Band, Jal, and Entity Paradigm. He also directed the video “Chal Bulleya” for Meekal Hassan Band. In 2004, Lashari briefly worked as assistant director for Shoaib Mansoor during pre-production of Khuda Kay Liye in 2004.

Finally, in 2013, Lashari got his start on Waar. The film opened to positive reviews and was Pakistan's highest-anticipated film at that time. It was his feature directorial debut. His next project in 2022, The Legend of Maula Jatt opened to positive reviews and is considered to be Pakistan's biggest blockbuster and most expensive film. It is also the second Pakistani film to use the Red Epic W camera as it was previously used for Waar, which is mostly used for certain Hollywood films.

Filmography

Music videos

Awards and nominations

ARY Film Awards

Hum Awards

Lux Style Award

References

Sources

External links 
 
 

Living people
Pakistani cinematographers
Pakistani film directors
Urdu film producers
Baloch people
Academy of Art University alumni
1984 births